National Institute for Biotechnology and Genetic Engineering or NIBGE is one of the main biotechnology institutes operated by Pakistan Atomic Energy Commission (PAEC). It was planned under the auspices of PAEC in 1987 and was formally inaugurated in 1994. It is affiliated to Pakistan Institute of Engineering & Applied Sciences (PIEAS) Islamabad, for awarding MPhil & PhD degrees. NIBGE is also the home institution of National Biology Talent Contest. The institute is located in Faisalabad.

Research Divisions

There are five research divisions at NIBGE:

 Agricultural Biotechnology Division (ABD)
 Health Biotechnology Division (HBD): offers services and products in areas of health biotechnology such as Human Molecular Genetics, Monogenic disorders, Karyotyping, Bacteriology, Complex disorders, Identification and synthesis of novel therapeutic agents.
 Industrial Biotechnology Division (IBD)
 Soil and Environmental Biotechnology Division (SEBD)
 Technical Services Division

Notable alumni and faculty
 Irshad Hussain

References

External links
Official website

Constituent institutions of Pakistan Atomic Energy Commission
Science and technology in Pakistan
Pakistan federal departments and agencies
1994 establishments in Pakistan